The Dutch Eredivisie in the 1961–62 season was contested by 18 teams. Feijenoord won the championship.

League standings

Results

See also
 1961–62 Eerste Divisie
 1961–62 Tweede Divisie

References

 Eredivisie official website - info on all seasons 
 RSSSF

Eredivisie seasons
Netherlands
1961–62 in Dutch football